Iniistius griffithsi, the Griffiths' razorfish, is a species of marine ray-finned fish 
from the family Labridae, the wrasses. It is found in the Indian Ocean.
  

Etymology
The fish is named in honor of Jeremy Griffiths, one of the two fishermen who captured the type specimen via handline.

References

griffithsi
Taxa named by John Ernest Randall
Fish described in 2007